Das Kabinett des Dr. Larifari ("The Cabinet of Dr. Larifari") is a 1930 German comedy film directed by Robert Wohlmuth and starring Max Hansen, Paul Morgan and Carl Jöken. The film is a parody of the German Film industry of the era. Its title is a reference to the 1919 expressionist film The Cabinet of Dr. Caligari.

Cast
 Max Hansen as Max Hansen / Pepperl Kröninger
 Paul Morgan as Paul Morgan / Sebaldus Kröninger / Ehemann (husband)
 Carl Jöken as Kammersänger Carl Jöken / Gesangspädagoge (singing instructor)
 Marianne Stanior as Sekretärin der Trio-Film (secretary of Trio film)
 Gisela Werbisek as Hedda Mutz-Kahla, Schriftstellerin (author)
 Alice Hechy as Ehefrau (wife)
 Else Reval as Sängerin (vocalist)
 Ellen Plessow
 Willy Prager as Patient (patient)
 Karl Harbacher as Leopold, Kellner (waiter)
 Wolfgang von Schwindt as Arzt (doctor)
 Henry Berg
 Gerhard Dammann as Gast / Schwiegervater (guest / father-in-law)
 Gyula Szőreghy
 Erik Ode as Wolfgang Anglert, Chefredakteur (editor-in-chief)
 Die Weintraub Syncopators as Orchester (orchestra)
 Ida Krill as Das Dienstmädchen (the handmaiden)

References

Bibliography 
 Bock, Hans-Michael & Bergfelder, Tim. The Concise CineGraph. Encyclopedia of German Cinema. Berghahn Books, 2009.

External links 
 

1930 films
Films of the Weimar Republic
German comedy films
1930s German-language films
Films directed by Robert Wohlmuth
1930s parody films
Films about filmmaking
Tobis Film films
Terra Film films
German black-and-white films
1930 comedy films
1930s German films